Nipan Deka  (born 15 November 2001) is an Indian cricketer. He made his Twenty20 debut for Assam in the 2017–18 Zonal T20 League on 8 January 2018.

References

External links
 

Living people
Indian cricketers
Assam cricketers
Place of birth missing (living people)
2001 births